Klaus Bodinger (14 May 1932 – 6 April 1994) was a German swimmer who specialized in the 200 m breaststroke. In this discipline he won two national titles in 1952–1953 and a gold medal at the 1954 European Aquatics Championships competing for East Germany. He then moved to West Germany, where he won three national titles in 1955, 1957 and 1958. He also won a bronze medal at the 1958 European Aquatics Championships competing for West Germany.

References

1932 births
1994 deaths
Sportspeople from Wrocław
German male swimmers
German male breaststroke swimmers
European Aquatics Championships medalists in swimming
20th-century German people